Maurides Roque Junior (born 10 March 1994), commonly known as Maurides, is a Brazilian professional footballer who plays as a striker for German  club FC St. Pauli.

He is the younger brother of two footballers, Muller and Maicon.

Career 
In 2013, after being named to the first team of Sport Club Internacional, Maurides played against América Mineiro in the Copa do Brasil. In the 88th minute of the game, Maurides celebrated a goal trying a backflip and sustained an injury to his right knee that kept him sidelined for 13 months.

After several spells in Brazil and Portugal, on 12 July 2018, Maurides signed with Bulgarian club CSKA Sofia for an undisclosed fee.

In February 2019, he signed a two-year contract with Changchun Yatai.

Maurides joined Korean second tier side FC Anyang as a free agent in February 2020, after China League One was postponed indefinitely.

In December 2022 it was announced Maurides would join 2. Bundesliga club FC St. Pauli for the second half of the 2022–23 season.

Career statistics

References

External links
 

1994 births
Living people
Brazilian footballers
Association football forwards
Campeonato Brasileiro Série A players
Primeira Liga players
First Professional Football League (Bulgaria) players
China League One players
K League 2 players
Ekstraklasa players
Sport Club Internacional players
Atlético Clube Goianiense players
F.C. Arouca players
Figueirense FC players
C.F. Os Belenenses players
PFC CSKA Sofia players
Changchun Yatai F.C. players
FC Anyang players
Radomiak Radom players
FC St. Pauli players
Brazilian expatriate footballers
Brazilian expatriate sportspeople in Portugal
Expatriate footballers in Portugal
Brazilian expatriate sportspeople in Bulgaria
Expatriate footballers in Bulgaria
Brazilian expatriate sportspeople in China
Expatriate footballers in China
Brazilian expatriate sportspeople in Poland
Expatriate footballers in Poland
Brazilian expatriate sportspeople in Germany
Expatriate footballers in Germany